Mr. Gay World Philippines 2017 (MGWP) is the official national pageant for Mr. Gay World 2017. It is organized by Mr. Gay World Philippines Organization founded by Wilbert Ting Tolentino, Mr. Gay World-Philippines national director, Mr. Gay World Philippines 2009 and Philippines' first representative to the Mr. Gay World 2009 in Canada.

Baguio's John Fernandez Raspado will be representing the Philippines in 2017's Mr. Gay World competition. Raspado was named Mr. Gay World Philippines 2016 at the University of the Philippines Theater in Quezon City.

Zamboanga del Sur's Khalil Vera Cruz was named second runner-up, while Pangasinan's John Bench Ortiz was named first runner-up. Raspado also won other special awards, including Best in National Costume, Best in Casual Wear, and Mr. Gay World Philippines Popularity. Back in May 2014, Raspado won the title of the first-ever "I Am PoGay."

Regional candidates

Preliminary competition

Pre-pageant night 
The Pre-pageant night was held on September 17, 2016, at Trinity University of Asia in Quezon City. It constitutes three major competitions: Casual Wear, Swimwear and Formal Wear. Hence, Mr. Pangasinan bagged the first two special awards and Mr. Zamboanga del Sur got the Best in Formal Wear.

Closed-Door Interview 
45% of the overall criteria falls to this category wherein candidates were asked random questions from a different set of judges.

National Costume 
Each candidate was asked to wear their own costume that has captured the essence and style of the native provinces and cities they represented. The winner for this category may used for 2017's Mr. Gay World as an official national costume for the country.

Talent Competition 
This is a non-criteria round. Mr. Baguio was award the highest due to its fusion of traditional Igurot dance with modern music. Mr. Rizal got second place.

The Finale 
All the scores from the Preliminary Competition were accumulated to define the Top 13. Score from its Talent round is not considered.

Fast Track 
Two important special awards will be considered to advance to the semi-finals: Social Media award and Mr. Popularity. Both were given to Cavite's John Jeffrey Carlos and Baguio's John Fernandez Raspado.

The Result

Controversies

Local fashion designers 
Renowned local fashion designers participated in the event as they created various collection of festive costumes and formal wear.

Withdrawal 
Mr. Bataan and Mr. Surigao del Norte withdrew prior the pre-pageant night due to working constraints by their employers.

Gay police candidate 
Taguig's Police Officer 1 Jessie G. Quitevis was a media spotlight prior to the finale due to his profession. He was featured in several major radio and TV guesting.

Muslim group 
Muslim groups in the province of Lanao del Sur were outraged with the participation of Omar Naga, a Muslim descent candidate who came from a Maranao tribe in Marawi.

Military family 
Three of the candidates came from military backgrounds: Angeles's Plaveo Pineda, Misamis Occidental's Ian Roy Jamison Paderanga and Davao City's Jerome Mantilla.

By regions

References

External links
 http://mrgayworldphilippines.ph

Philippines 2017
2017 beauty pageants
2017 in the Philippines
2017 in LGBT history